Ben Player is an Australian bodyboarder who was world champion in 2005, 2007 and 2013. His 2007 victory came after placing second (narrowly being defeated by Damian King) in the 2006 Pipeline final. He has finished #2 overall on the World Bodyboarding Tour several times. Ben now also helps run Movement Bodyboarding magazine.

References

External links
  Official site
 Movement Bodyboarding AUS Movement Magazine Australia
 Bodyboarding Magazine Movement Magazine USA

Bodyboarders
Living people
Year of birth missing (living people)
Australian surfers